Jemea I. Thomas (born April 7, 1990) is a former American football cornerback. He was drafted by the New England Patriots in the sixth round of the 2014 NFL Draft. He played college football at Georgia Tech.

Early years
A native of Fitzgerald, Georgia, Thomas attended Fitzgerald High School, where he was named the 2008 AJC Class AA Defensive Player of the Year. As a senior in 2008, he rushed for 518 yards on 59 carries (8.8 yards avg) and seven touchdowns. Defensively, he had 140 tackles with three blocked field goals and four interceptions. Had Jersey retired.

Considered a three-star recruit by Rivals.com, he was rated as the 36th best athlete prospect of his class.

College career
Thomas attended Georgia Tech and played for the Yellow Jackets from 2009 to 2013. As a true freshman, he appeared in all 14 games in a back-up role, recording 10 tackles, a fumble recovery, and a pass break-up. In 2010, he was redshirted due to the depth of the safety position. In 2011, Thomas returned to action to play in all 13 games, including two starts. He recorded three interceptions, which led the team, 50 tackles, including four for loss and two sacks. In 2012, he started all 14 games, and ranked second on the team in tackles with 86, and first on the team in interceptions with four.  In 2013, he played and started in all 13 games, and led the team in tackles (88) and pass break-ups (8). He also added two interceptions and two forced fumbles.

Professional career

New England Patriots
He was selected by the New England Patriots in the sixth round (206th overall) of the 2014 NFL Draft. On May 18, 2014, the Patriots signed Thomas to a four-year deal. He was released on August 26.

Dallas Cowboys
On August 27, 2014, Thomas was claimed off waivers by the Dallas Cowboys. On September 1, he was cut and signed to the practice squad one day later. He was released on September 16.

St. Louis Rams
On September 19, 2014, the St. Louis Rams signed him to the practice squad. On October 25, he was promoted to the active roster. On October 29, he was released and re-signed to the practice squad 2 days later.

Tennessee Titans
On December 3, 2014, he was signed by the Tennessee Titans from the St. Louis Rams practice squad. He was released by the team on September 4, 2015.

References

External links
Georgia Tech Yellow Jackets bio

1990 births
Living people
People from Fitzgerald, Georgia
Players of American football from Georgia (U.S. state)
American football safeties
American football cornerbacks
Georgia Tech Yellow Jackets football players
New England Patriots players
Dallas Cowboys players
St. Louis Rams players
Tennessee Titans players